Robert Allen Keselowski (August 1, 1951 – December 22, 2021) was an American professional stock car racing driver. He owned K Automotive Racing and was a competitor in the ARCA Hooters SuperCar Series and the NASCAR Craftsman Truck Series.

Racing career
In the ARCA Series, he had 24 wins, 26 poles, and a 1989 championship.

Keselowski was one of the original drivers in the Camping World Truck Series in 1995 when it raced under the name the NASCAR SuperTruck Series. After finishing 15th in the inaugural season, he finished 16th in the second season. Keselowski won his only NASCAR race when he won the 1997 Virginia Is For Lovers 200 at Richmond International Raceway. He competed one more full season and two part-time seasons before his NASCAR career was over.

Personal life
Born to John and Roberta, Bob’s father John, a former motorcycle racer turned owner was Keselowski’s first car owner when he broke into the racing scene. Keselowski's sons Brad and Brian compete in NASCAR. His brother Ron Keselowski raced in NASCAR in the early 1970s and he had been Bob's car owner.

After a two year battle with cancer, Keselowski died on December 22, 2021, at the age of 70. Sean Corr ran the #29 in the 2022 Lucas Oil 200 in honor.

Motorsports career results

NASCAR
(key) (Bold – Pole position awarded by qualifying time. Italics – Pole position earned by points standings or practice time. * – Most laps led.)

Winston Cup Series

Craftsman Truck Series

ARCA Hooters SuperCar Series
(key) (Bold – Pole position awarded by qualifying time. Italics – Pole position earned by points standings or practice time. * – Most laps led.)

References

External links

1951 births
2021 deaths
People from Rochester, Michigan
American people of Polish descent
Racing drivers from Detroit
Racing drivers from Michigan
NASCAR drivers
ARCA Menards Series drivers
Trans-Am Series drivers
NASCAR team owners
American Speed Association drivers
Keselowski family
Deaths from cancer in the United States